The 2019–20 RCD Espanyol season was the club's 85th season in existence and the club's 25th consecutive season in the top flight of Spanish football. In addition to the domestic league, Espanyol participated in this season's edition of the Copa del Rey, and the UEFA Europa League. The season originally covered a period from 1 July 2019 to 30 June 2020. It was extended extraordinarily beyond 30 June due to the COVID-19 pandemic in Spain.

Players

Current squad

Reserve team

Out on loan

Transfers

In

Out

Pre-season and friendlies

Competitions

Overview

La Liga

Results summary

Results by round

Matches
The La Liga schedule was announced on 4 July 2019.

Copa del Rey

UEFA Europa League

Second qualifying round

Third qualifying round

Play-off round

Group stage

Knockout phase

Round of 32

Statistics

Appearances and goals
Last updated on the end of the season.

|-
! colspan=14 style=background:#dcdcdc; text-align:center|Goalkeepers

|-
! colspan=14 style=background:#dcdcdc; text-align:center|Defenders

|-
! colspan=14 style=background:#dcdcdc; text-align:center|Midfielders

|-
! colspan=14 style=background:#dcdcdc; text-align:center|Forwards

|-
! colspan=14 style=background:#dcdcdc; text-align:center| Players who have made an appearance or had a squad number this season but have left the club

|}

Goalscorers
Last updated on 2 July 2020.

References

RCD Espanyol
RCD Espanyol seasons
Espanyol